Galaxy 500 is the third studio album by alternative rock band Fetchin Bones. It was released in 1987 through Capitol Records.

Track listing 
All songs written by Fetchin Bones

Personnel 

Fetchin Bones
 Hope Nicholls – vocals, harmonica
 Danna Pentes – bass guitar
 Aaron Pitkin – guitar
 Clay Richardson – drums
 Errol Stewart – guitar

Additional musicians and production
 Tim Carr – executive production
 Don Dixon – production
 Laurie Douglas – art direction
 Fetchin Bones – design
 Raymond Grubb – photography
 Steve Haigler – engineering
 Mitchell Kearney – photography
 Don "Cannonball" McClure – alto saxophone
 Tom Thoune – illustrations

External links

References 

1987 albums
Albums produced by Don Dixon (musician)
Capitol Records albums
Fetchin Bones albums